Liam Campbell is a former professional rugby league footballer who played in the 2000s.

References

External links
Barrow Raiders profile
Raiders slide to Halifax defeat

Living people
Barrow Raiders players
English rugby league players
Place of birth missing (living people)
Rugby league halfbacks
Wakefield Trinity players
Workington Town players
Year of birth missing (living people)